Ilyino-Polyana is a rural locality (a selo) and the administrative centre of Ilyino-Polyansky Selsoviet, Blagoveshchensky District, Bashkortostan, Russia. The population was 2,039 as of 2010. There are 11 streets.

Geography 
Ilyino-Polyana is located 19 km east of Blagoveshchensk (the district's administrative centre) by road. Turushla is the nearest rural locality.

References 

Rural localities in Blagoveshchensky District